Volodymyr Martynenko  (6 October 1923 – 18 April 1988) was a Ukrainian diplomat. He served as Permanent Representative of Ukraine to the United Nations. Minister of Foreign Affairs of the Ukrainian SSR.

Early life 
Volodymyr Martynenko graduated from Taras Shevchenko National University of Kyiv (1951).

Career 
From 1965–1968 he was a member of the Soviet Embassy in Canada.

From 1968–1973 he served as Deputy Minister of Foreign Affairs of the Ukrainian SSR.

From 1973–1979 he was the Permanent Representative of the Ukrainian SSR to the United Nations.

From 1979–1980 he served as Deputy Minister of Foreign Affairs of the Ukrainian SSR.

From 18 November 1980 to 28 December 1984 he was Minister of Foreign Affairs of the Ukrainian SSR.

From 1984–1988 he was a senior researcher at the Institute of History of Ukraine.

Diplomatic rank 
 Ambassador Extraordinary and Plenipotentiary

References

External links 
 LIBYAN SEEKS EXPULSION OF ISRAEL FROM U.N.
 UNITED NATIONS SECURITY COUNCIL OFFICIAL RECORDS THIRTY-NINTH YEAR 2542nd MEETING: 25 MAY 1984 NEW YORK
 Diplomacy in the Former Soviet Republics James P. Nichol Greenwood Publishing Group, 1.01.1995 – 244.
 Soroka D. I. Historical retrospective of Ukraine's cooperation with the United Nations

1923 births
1988 deaths
People from Zhytomyr Oblast
People from Volhynian Governorate
Soviet foreign ministers of Ukraine
Permanent Representatives of Ukraine to the United Nations
20th-century Ukrainian historians
Tenth convocation members of the Verkhovna Rada of the Ukrainian Soviet Socialist Republic
20th-century Ukrainian politicians